Saogat, also called Saugat ( Presentation), was a leading Bengali literary journal. First published in Calcutta in 1918, its editor was Mohammad Nasiruddin. Abdul Karim, a scholar, also edited the magazine, which was published on a monthly basis. It mostly covered the work of Bengali Muslim authors and supported for the involvement of Bengali Muslim women in literary activities.

The publication of Saogat was kept suspended in 1922 due to financial constraints. In 1926, its publication was resumed and since then it continued uninterruptedly until 1947.

References

Bengali-language magazines
Defunct literary magazines
Defunct magazines published in India
Literary magazines published in India
Monthly magazines published in India
Magazines established in 1918
Magazines disestablished in 1947
Mass media in Dhaka
Mass media in Kolkata